Amber Radio was a classic hits/gold radio station operating from studios in both Norwich and Ipswich, in the region of East Anglia in the United Kingdom.

It was the AM sister station of Radio Broadland and SGR and served Norfolk and Suffolk, covering a population of over a million.

History

The station was launched after East Anglian Radio decided to make better use of the group's medium wave frequencies. On 24 September 1995, the AM frequencies of Broadland and SGR fm  became Amber Radio, playing mainly music from the 1960s and 1970s, allowing the FM stations to focus more on current and recent chart hits. All the stations were programmed by EAR group programme director Mike Stewart, with Dave Brown in Norwich and Mark Pryke at Ipswich as local heads of presentation. Programmes emanated from the two broadcast centres for both group and separate areas.

The station continued for some time in the same format and under the same management after a takeover of the East Anglian Radio group by GWR about a year later.  Amber Radio was eventually renamed Classic Gold Amber and it joined GWR's Classic Gold Digital Network of stations in 1998. 
During the same year, GWR began to pressurise the Radio Authority to allow them to 'network' Classic Gold for up to 20 hours a day. This meant that all of the stations in the Classic Gold network would receive the same programmes for most of the day, including the stations in Norwich and Ipswich.

GWR's argument was that the use of higher profile presenters would allow listeners a better quality of service. The Radio Authority agreed to the change and all the stations began sharing the programmes produced in Dunstable in Bedfordshire, more than 100 miles from the Norwich studios.  At this stage, the only local programme remaining on Classic Gold Amber was the Breakfast Show, this was later changed to Drivetime to allow Mike Read and later Dave Lee Travis to present a networked breakfast show.

Due to GWR exceeding the ownership limit of stations, the Classic Gold stations were sold to UBC Media, although GWR kept hold of a 20 per cent stake. On 3 August 2007 the stations were re-branded as Gold. This followed the GCap Media purchase of the Classic Gold network and the merging of the Capital Gold and Classic Gold stations.

Branding

Prior to being taken over by GWR, Amber Radio's station idents were specially written by American jingles specialist, Bruce Upchurch and produced by UK-based David Arnold Music with Mike Stewart at Thompson Creative in Dallas, Texas.

From launch, Amber Radio, along with its sister stations, Broadland 102 (Norfolk) and SGR FM / SGR Colchester (Suffolk / Essex), broadcast jingles made at TM Studios (previously Century 21), also in Dallas, Texas.

References

External links
Article about computers taking over radio which refers to Amber Radio/Classic Gold Amber
Former presenter website
Discussion on Amber Radio's merger with Gold network
Article on GWRs roll out of Classic Gold

Defunct radio stations in the United Kingdom
Radio stations in Norfolk
Radio stations established in 1995
Radio stations disestablished in 2007
Radio stations in Suffolk